Doucoumbo or Doucombo is a village and rural commune in the Bandiagara Cercle of the Mopti Region of Mali. The commune contains 24 villages and at the time of the 2009 census had a population of 11,510. The village of Doucoumbo is 5 km west of Bandiagara on the RN15 that links Bandiagara to Sévaré.

References

External links
.

Communes of Mopti Region